Stephen Julius Masele (MP)  (born October 1, 1979) is a Tanzanian Diplomat, Member of Parliament, global young politician and a former Investment Banker. Masele is the current First-Vice President of the Pan-African Parliament (PAP), an organ of the African Union based in South Africa. Elected in May 2018, he oversees Administration and Human Resources of the Continental Body among others. He also presides over the Pan-African Parliamentary Alliance on Food Security and Nutrition (PAP-FSN), a joint PAP-FAO project for Africa. He has been a member of the Pan-African Parliament since 2010.

Background 
He is a former member of the Inter-Parliamentary Union (IPU) based in Geneva, Switzerland and previously served as Deputy Minister of State in the Vice-President's Office as well as Deputy Minister of Energy and Minerals between 2012 and 2015. Masele spent a number of years working in the private sector in Tanzania including spells with Standard Chartered Bank, Stanbic Bank and Tigo Telecoms Company. He is regarded to have extensive experience in Business, Public Office, African politics, International Affairs and Corporate Affairs.

Education 
A Fellow of the Mandela Washington Fellowship for the Young African Leaders since 2014,  Masele has attended several post-graduate programs at Harvard University, Kennedy School of Government (2012), Florida International University (FIU) in USA, School of Public Management (2014). He graduated with a Master of Science in Entrepreneurship from the Lund University School of Economics in Sweden as well as a B.A in Political Science and Public Administration at the University of Dar es Salaam in Tanzania.

References

1979 births
Living people
Chama Cha Mapinduzi MPs
Tanzanian MPs 2010–2015
Deputy government ministers of Tanzania
Mwenge Secondary School alumni
University of Dar es Salaam alumni
Pan-African Parliament